SPDC has multiple meanings, including:

 Self-Protecting Digital Content
 Shell Petroleum Development Company of Nigeria
 State Peace and Development Council, the military regime of Myanmar (also known as Burma)
 Spontaneous parametric down-conversion, a process in quantum optics
 Social Policy and Development Centre, an economic policy research institution in Pakistan
 Steorn Private Developers Club
 Scholarship Programme for Diaspora Children, a scholarship given by the Indian Government to the People of Indian Origin and NRIs.